Parornichinae is a subfamily of moths described by Vladimir Ivanovitsch Kuznetzov and Svetlana Vladimirovna Baryshnikova in 2001.

Diversity and distribution

Description

Biology

Genera
In alphabetical order:

Callisto Stephens, 1834
=Annickia Gibeaux, 1990
Graphiocephala Vári, 1961
Parornix Spuler, 1910
=Alfaornix Kuznetzov, 1979
=Betaornix Kuznetzov, 1979
=Deltaornix Kuznetzov, 1979
=Gammaornix Kuznetzov, 1979
Pleiomorpha Vári, 1961

References

Moth subfamilies
Gracillariidae